Communist Youth of Spain (marxist-leninist) (JCE (ml)) was a communist youth organization in Spain, connected to the Communist Party of Spain (Marxist-Leninist).

JCE (ml) emerged in the 1970s as a clandestine organization. It published Joven Guardia. In 1974 JCE (ml) was one of the organizations contributing to the founding of FRAP (Revolutionary Antifascist Patriotic Front).

References

Youth wings of communist parties
Youth wings of political parties in Spain